Aleksandr Petrovich Nevokshonov (born 29 December 1984) is a former Russian professional football player.

Club career
After his return 2010 to FC Yelets Nevokshonov was transferred to the Latvian Higher League club FK Spartaks Jūrmala. He was mainly used as a reserve keeper, making 5 league appearances during 2 seasons at the club.

He played 3 seasons in the Russian Football National League for FC SKA-Energiya Khabarovsk.

External links

References

1984 births
Living people
People from Yelets
Russian footballers
Association football goalkeepers
FC Shinnik Yaroslavl players
FC Spartak Moscow players
FC SKA-Khabarovsk players
FK Spartaks Jūrmala players
Latvian Higher League players
Russian expatriate footballers
Expatriate footballers in Latvia
Russian expatriates in Latvia
Sportspeople from Lipetsk Oblast